Aquí y Ahora is the 4th studio album by Gibraltarian pop rock band Taxi released on May 25, 2010.

Track listing
Algo de Amor
Perdido en la Calle
Aunque me pidas perdón
Ella
Polvo de Estrellas
En mi prisión
Un final de verdad
Somos más
Viento
Ahi te quedas
Se acabó

2010 albums
Spanish-language albums